Mark Brown (born May 19, 1980) is a former American football linebacker. Brown played college football for Auburn University, before signing with the New York Jets as an undrafted free agent in 2003. On May 4, 2006, the Arizona Cardinals signed Brown as an unrestricted free agent, but he was released later on that offseason. He now lives and works in Marietta, Georgia as a personal trainer.  Brown was engaged to Candace N. Cagle, October 23, 2010. She played women's soccer at Auburn University, where they met.

References

1980 births
Living people
African-American players of American football
American football linebackers
Auburn Tigers football players
New York Jets players
Players of American football from Paterson, New Jersey
21st-century African-American sportspeople
20th-century African-American people